Philip James Voss (20 August 1936 – 13 November 2020) was a British stage, radio, film and television actor.

Early life 
Voss was born in Leicester, the elder son of James Voss, a pharmacist, and his wife, Viola (née Walmsley). He had a younger brother, John. When he and his family moved to the village of Wollaton, near Nottingham, he attended Nottingham High Pavement Grammar School. He joined a local amateur theatre and, after national service with the RAF, trained for the stage at RADA.

Career 
Voss  played roles in the Doctor Who serials Marco Polo and The Dominators, Frankenstein and the Monster from Hell, the 1981  Lord of the Rings radio series, Indian Summer, an RSC 1996 revival of The White Devil, The Brides in the Bath, two plays in the Arkangel Shakespeare and a small role in an audio dramatisation of an Anton Chekhov short story. He also played recurring roles in the TV series Fish as Ivan Vishnevski and Vicious as Ian McKellen's cynical brother Mason Thornhill.

Other credits include a stint at the London Shakespeare Workout, two roles for the Shared Experience Company (in Three Sisters and The Seagull), and playing Serebryakov in a West End rendition of Anton Chekhov's The Wood Daemon. At the RSC during the 1990s, he played Menenius in Coriolanus, Sir Epicure Mammon in Ben Jonson’s The Alchemist, Ulysses in Troilus and Cressida, Malvolio in Twelfth Night, Shylock in The Merchant of Venice, and Prospero in The Tempest.

Personal life and death
From the 1970s onwards, Voss lived in Bushey, Hertfordshire, with his partner, writer John Peacock. They entered into a civil partnership in 2006, and remained together until Peacock’s death in 2017. Voss died from cancer and complications of COVID-19 in Watford, Hertfordshire, on 13 November 2020, aged 84. He was survived by his brother.

Filmography

Film

Television

Theatre 
 Ivanov as Shabelsky, Director Trevor Nunn, National Theatre
 Love's Labour Lost as Boyet, Director Trevor Nunn, National Theatre
 As You Like It as Jaques, Director Peter Hall, Theatre Royal Bath/USA
 The Royal Hunt of the Sun as Miguel Estete, National Theatre
 Uncle Vanya as Alexandr Vladmiirovich Serebryakov, Director Hugh Fraser, Wilton's Music Hall
 The Giant as Lodovico/Soderini, Director Gregory Doran, Hampstead Theatre
 The Circle as Lord Porteous, Director Joanthan Church, Chichester Festival Theatre
 Apologia as Hugh, Director Josie Rourke, Bush Theatre
 Canary (2010) as Older Tom, Director Hettie MacDonald, Liverpool Everyman

Radio
 Aspects of Love as Sir George, BBC Radio
 The Lord of the Rings as the Lord of the Nazgûl, BBC Radio
 Tulips in Winter as Rabbi Menasseh Ben Israel, BBC Radio

References

External links
Philip Voss home Page

 

1936 births
2020 deaths
20th-century English male actors
21st-century English male actors
Alumni of RADA
English gay actors
Deaths from cancer in England
Deaths from the COVID-19 pandemic in England
English male film actors
English male radio actors
English male stage actors
English male television actors
Male actors from Leicestershire
People educated at Nottingham High Pavement Grammar School
People from Bushey
People from Leicester
Royal Shakespeare Company members
20th-century English LGBT people
21st-century English LGBT people